Rama Ranganathan is an American bioengineer.

Ranganathan studied bioengineering at the University of California, Berkeley, and earned a master's degree and doctorate at the University of California, San Diego. During his tenure at the University of Texas Southwestern Medical Center, he headed the Cecil H. and Ida Green Center for Systems Biology, and was a Howard Hughes Medical Investigator from 1997 to 2007. Ranganathan joined the University of Chicago faculty in 2017, as founding leader of the Center for Physics of Evolving Systems, a joint project of UChicago's Division of the Biological Sciences and the Institute for Molecular Engineering. In 2018, Ranganathan was appointed the Joseph Regenstein Professor in the Department of Biochemistry and Molecular Biology, as well as the Institute for Molecular Engineering.

References

Year of birth missing (living people)
Living people
American bioengineers
University of Texas Southwestern Medical Center faculty
University of Chicago faculty
Howard Hughes Medical Investigators
University of California, Berkeley alumni
University of California, San Diego alumni
20th-century American engineers
21st-century American engineers